Rudolph Philip "Bingo" Kampman (March 12, 1914 – December 22, 1987) was a Canadian ice hockey defenceman. He played in the National Hockey League with the Toronto Maple Leafs between 1937 and 1942. He was born in Berlin, Ontario.

Career statistics

Regular season and playoffs

Awards and achievements
1942 Stanley Cup  Championship  (Toronto Maple Leafs)

External links
 
 Picture of Bingo Kampman's Name on the 1942 Stanley Cup Plaque

1914 births
1987 deaths
Canadian ice hockey defencemen
Fresno Falcons players
Ice hockey people from Ontario
Kitchener Greenshirts players
Ontario Hockey Association Senior A League (1890–1979) players
Ottawa Senators (QSHL) players
Providence Reds players
St. Louis Flyers players
Sportspeople from Kitchener, Ontario
Stanley Cup champions
Syracuse Stars (AHL) players
Toronto Maple Leafs players